Jan-Olof Larsson, born 1951, is a Swedish social democratic politician who has been a member of the Riksdag from 30 September 2002 until 9 January 2017.

References
Jan-Olof Larsson (S)

1951 births
Living people
Members of the Riksdag from the Social Democrats
Members of the Riksdag 2002–2006
Place of birth missing (living people)
Date of birth missing (living people)